Beggiato is an Italian surname. Notable people with the surname include:

Ettore Beggiato (born 1954), Italian historian and politician
Luigi Beggiato (born 1998), Italian swimmer

Italian-language surnames